The 2003 Suwon Samsung Bluewings season was Suwon Samsung Bluewings's eighth season in the K-League in Republic of Korea. Suwon Samsung Bluewings is competing in K-League and Korean FA Cup.

Squad

Backroom Staff

Coaching Staff
Head coach:  Kim Ho
Assistant coach:  Wang Sun-Jae
Coach:  Yoon Sung-Hyo
Reserve Team Coach:  Afshin Ghotbi
GK Coach:  Cosa
Physical trainer:  Lee Chang-Yeop

Scouter
 Jung Kyu-Poong

Honours

Club

Individual
K-League Best Goal:  Seo Jung-Won

References

External links
 Suwon Bluewings Official website

Suwon Samsung Bluewings seasons
Suwon Samsung Bluewings